Gumpoldskirchen is a railway station in the town of Gumpoldskirchen in Lower Austria.

References 

Railway stations in Lower Austria
Austrian Federal Railways